Tony Guntharp (born May 16, 1969) was the team project manager and one of the four co-founders of SourceForge (along with Uriah Welcome, Tim Perdue and Drew Streib) which launched in November 1999. Prior to this he had co-founded Fresher Information Corp., an object oriented database management software firm.

He eventually left VA Software (the owners of the SF property) after VA Software shut down the systems-hardware business.

He also co-authored Practical Linux.

Damage Studios
Later, he founded Damage Studios with several former VA employees, including Greg Kucharo, Steve Westmoreland, Joseph Arruda, San Mehat, Chris DiBona and Craig Ross.

References

1969 births
Living people
American computer programmers
Geeknet